The following is a list of ecoregions in Albania defined by the World Wide Fund for Nature (WWF).

Temperate broadleaf and mixed forests
Balkan mixed forests
Dinaric Mountains mixed forests

Mediterranean forests, woodlands, and shrub
Illyrian deciduous forests
Pindus Mountains mixed forests 

Ecoregions of Albania
ecoregions
Albania
Flora of Albania